Conexión is the first live album by the Mexican singer-songwriter María José. It was recorded in front of a selected audience to attend the concert located in Mexico City. In celebration of the tenth anniversary of her breakout album Amante de lo Ajeno, the album celebrates José's trajectory as a solo artist. The album includes material from her previous five studio albums as well as eight newly recorded songs. Featured guest include Ha*Ash, Yuri, Carlos Rivera and Vanesa Martin.

Promotion

Singles 
Four singles have been released in support of the album. "Hábito de Ti" was released on January 25, 2019, as the lead single. The song features the Spanish singer Vanessa Martin who originally wrote the song for herself. José approached the singer wanting to collaborate on a song, Martin agreed and told her she could pick from a handful of songs the singer had written. José chose "Hábito de Ti" as she felt a connection with the song. "Un Nuevo Amor", which had previously been released as a single from her third album Amante de lo Bueno, was re-released as the album's second digital single on April 15, 2019. "Derroche" was released as the album's third single on April 26, 2019. "Lo Que Tenías Conmigo" was released on May 5, 2019, as the second radio single and fourth overall.

Promotional singles 
On August 14, 2019, it was revealed hat "El Era Perfecto", the album's first promotional single and fifth overall from the album, was expected to be released on August 16, 2019. "Rosas en Mi Almohada" featuring Ha*Ash, was released on January 27, 2020, as the second promotional single.

Track listing 
All tracks are produced solely by Armando Ávila.

Certifications

Release history

References 

María José (singer) live albums
2019 live albums
2019 video albums
Spanish-language live albums